Hog Branch is a stream in Bates County, Missouri and Linn County, Kansas. It is a tributary of Mulberry Creek.

.

Hog Branch was named for the hogs along its course.

See also
List of rivers of Missouri

References

Rivers of Bates County, Missouri
Rivers of Linn County, Kansas
Rivers of Missouri